Lindhurst High School is located in Olivehurst, California, USA.  It is one of two high schools in the Marysville Joint Unified School District of Yuba County and draws students from the communities of Olivehurst, Linda, Plumas Lake, and Marysville.

It was the site of the Lindhurst High School shooting in 1992.

Notable alumni
D. A. Powell, poet (Class of 1981)

References

External links
http://www.columbine-angels.com/lindhurst_story.htm The Lindhurst story at Columbine Angels
http://mjusdlindhurst.ss4.sharpschool.com/  Lindhurst High School's website

High schools in Yuba County, California
Public high schools in California
1975 establishments in California